Unleashed is an American reality competition television program that aired on Nickelodeon from October 22 to December 17, 2020. The program is hosted by Gabriel Iglesias, with judges Peyton List, Preacher Lawson, and Utkarsh Ambudkar.

Production 
On October 2, 2020, it was announced that a new animal competition program, Unleashed, would premiere on October 22, 2020. Gabriel Iglesias hosted the program while Peyton List, Preacher Lawson, and Utkarsh Ambudkar served as judges. The program was given a 10-episode order. A sneak peek of the program aired on October 12, 2020.

Episodes

References

External links 
 
 

2020s American reality television series
2020 American television series debuts
2020 American television series endings
2020s Nickelodeon original programming
English-language television shows
Television series by Fremantle (company)